A list of villages in the Durham Dales, England.



A 
Allensford, Aukside

B 
Barnigham, Bedburn, Benfieldside, Boldron, Bowbank, Bowes, Bowlees, Bridgehill, Brignall, Brotherlee

C 
Close House, Copley, Copthill, Cornriggs, Cowshill, Cornsay, Cornsay Colliery, Cotherstone, Craigside, Crawleyside

D 
Daddry Shield, Delves Lane, Dent Bank, Dipton

E 
East Blackdene, East Briscoe, Eastgate, Edmundbyers, Egglesburn, Eggleston, Escomb, Esh, Ettersgill

F 
Fir Tree, Forest-in-Teesdale, Frosterley

G 
Gilmonby, Grassholme, Greta Bridge

H 
Hamsterley, Hamsterley, Consett, Harwood, Healeyfield, High Dyke, Hill End, Hill Top, Holwick, Horsleyhope, Hunderthwaite, Hunstanworth, Hury, Hutton Magna

I 
Inkerman, Ireshopeburn

K 
Kinninvie

L 
Laithkirk, Lanehead, Langdon Beck, Lartington, Little Newsham, Low Etherley

M 
Mickleton, Middle Side, Morley, Muggleswick

N
New House, Newbiggin

O 
Ovington

p 
Pontop Pike

R 
Ramshaw, Romaldkirk, Rookhope

S 
Scargill, Shotley Bridge, Snaisgill, St John's Chapel, Staindrop, Stainton, Startforth

T 
The Grove, Thornley, Thringarth, Toft Hill, Townfield

W 
Waskerley, Wearhead, West Blackdene, West Pasture, Westgate, Westwick, Whorlton, Winston, Witton-le-Wear, Wolsingham, Woodland, Wycliffe

Durham Dales
Durham